Mirror is the second album released by D'espairsRay on April 11, 2007 in Japan and on June 22 of the same year in Europe. The first press limited edition release from Japan came housed in a paper case along with one of five picture cards that feature one of the band members. The album was released in America on March 18, 2008. The album is composed of new songs, previously released singles, and "Closer to Ideal", a track originally published on the bonus CD of the Liquidize photo book. The European edition comes with an additional track ("Desert", a B-side from the "Squall" single) and the music videos of "Squall" and "Trickster".

Music
The music in Mirror has a notably more variable sound than the previous Coll:set album. It retains some of the gothic influence, while introducing an experimental pop music sound. Most of the album has a very fast tempo, only slowing for "Screen" and "Squall", however the band has called this unintentional.

Track listing

Personnel
Hizumi – vocals
Karyu – guitar
Zero - bass guitar
Tsukasa – drums

References

2007 albums
D'espairsRay albums